Stefan may refer to:

 Stefan (given name)
 Stefan (surname)
 Ștefan, a Romanian given name and a surname
 Štefan, a Slavic given name and surname
 Stefan (footballer) (born 1988), Brazilian footballer
 Stefan Heym, pseudonym of German writer Helmut Flieg (1913–2001)
 Stefan (honorific), a Serbian title
 Stefan (album), a 1987 album by Dennis González

See also
 Stefan number, a dimensionless number used in heat transfer
 Sveti Stefan or Saint Stefan, a small islet in Montenegro
 Stefanus (disambiguation)